Capital Airport–Daxing Airport intercity railway connecting line, is a higher-speed railway line currently under construction. The speed will be 200 km/h. It will connect the Beijing Capital International Airport and Beijing Daxing International Airport when the full line is completed.

Phase 1 of the railway, which is currently under construction, will connect Langfang (a city in Hebei Province) and Beijing Daxing International Airport. Phase 1 is 39.438 km, including 15.3 km in Beijing and 24.138 km in Hebei Province. Phase 1 of the railway will be finished in 2024.

The second phase from Langfang East railway station to Huairou South railway station via Capital Airport is under planning.

Stations

Phase 1 (under construction)
Phase 1 of the railway (Daxing Airport to Langfang East) is shared with the Langzhuo (Langfang–Zhuozhou) intercity railway (Chinese: 廊涿城际铁路).

Phase 2 (under planning)
The Phase 2 of the railway will be replaced by New Town Link Line (S6) of Beijing Subway and the stations on the line have not announced.

Notes

References

Rail transport in Beijing
Rail transport in Hebei
Railway lines in China